The 2023 Houston Cougars football team will represent University of Houston in the Big 12 Conference during the 2023 NCAA Division I FBS football season. The Cougars are expected to be led by Dana Holgorsen in his fifth season as their head coach.  The Cougars play their home games at TDECU Stadium in Houston, Texas.

In September 2021, Cincinnati, BYU, Houston, and UCF accepted bids to join the Big 12. On June 10, the American Athletic Conference and the three American Athletic Conference schools schools set to depart from the league (Cincinnati, Houston, and UCF) announced that they had reached a buyout agreement with the conference that will allow those schools to join the Big 12 Conference in 2023. BYU had previously operated as an independent prior to accepting a membership invitation to join the Big 12 conference.

Offseason

Transfers

Outgoing

Incoming

Schedule

References

Houston
Houston Cougars football seasons
Houston Cougars football